Myles Steven Ferguson (January 3, 1981 – September 29, 2000) was a Canadian actor.

Biography 

He was born in North Vancouver, British Columbia, the son of Mike and Karen Ferguson, and brother of Alexandra, Skylar, and Wylie Ferguson. Myles died in a car accident at the age of 19 on September 29, 2000.

Partial filmography

Television

 Avalanche (1994) - Max Kemp
 The Odyssey (2 episodes, 1994) - Bricks
 The Commish (1 episode, 1994) - Bobby MacGruder
 Are You Afraid of the Dark? (1 episode, 1994) - Jimmy Preston
 Hawkeye (1 episode, 1995) - Young Hawkeye
 Little Criminals (1995) - Cory
 The Other Mother: A Moment of Truth Movie (1995) - Brett Schaeffer
 Highlander: The Series (2 episodes, 1994–1995) - Kenny
 Strange Luck (1 episode, 1995) - Urchin / Bike Thief
 For Hope (1996) - Skinny Kid
 Viper (1 episode, 1997) - Kyle Reese
 The Sentinel (1 episode, 1997) - Alec Summers
 The X-Files (2 episodes, 1995–1998) - Joey Agostino / Boy in the Bus
 Two of Hearts (1999)
 The Outer Limits (episode, "Stranded" 1999)
 Poltergeist: The Legacy (3 episodes, 1996–1999) - Young Derek Rayne 
 Edgemont (13 episodes, 2000) - Scott Linton

Film
 Slam Dunk Ernest (1995) - Johnny
 Live TV (1996) - Jamie
 Air Bud: Golden Receiver (1998) - J.D.
 Question of Privilege (1999) - Ian Aldrige
 Snow Falling on Cedars (1999) - German Soldier
 MVP: Most Valuable Primate (2000) - Waterboy
 Spooky House (2000) - Mike The Mouth (final film role)

References

External links
 

1981 births
2000 deaths
Canadian male television actors
Male actors from British Columbia
People from North Vancouver
20th-century Canadian male actors
Road incident deaths in Canada